The 2006 Premier Hockey League Season was the second season of the Premier Hockey League.

Results
Bangalore Lions Champion of 2006. They defeated Chandigarh Dynamos in a best of three final series
Maratha Warriors relegated to Tier-2
Orissa Steelers promoted to Tier-1

References 

Premier Hockey League seasons
India
hockey